Jovana Karakašević (born 17 May 1992) is Serbian female basketball player.

Personal life
Jovana is a sister of Serbian basketball player Jefimija Karakašević.

References

External links
Profile at eurobasket.com

1992 births
Living people
People from Senta
Serbian women's basketball players
Centers (basketball)
ŽKK Partizan players
ŽKK Vojvodina players
ŽKK Crvena zvezda players
ŽKK Šumadija Kragujevac players
Serbian expatriate basketball people in Slovenia
Serbian expatriate basketball people in Hungary
Serbian expatriate sportspeople in Malta
Serbian expatriate basketball people in Romania